Dachung Musa Bagos was born on the 4th of June 1977 in Apata, Jos North Local Government Area of Plateau State. He his a Nigerian politician of the Peoples Democratic Party from Plateau State, Nigeria. He is a member of the Nigeria Federal House of Representatives  from Jos South/Jos East federal constituency of Plateau State in the 9th National Assembly. He was elected to the House in 2019.

His academic journey began at Ekan Primary School, after which he proceeded to the Jos Development Enterprise Commercial School for his Tertiary education where he obtained a Diploma in Secretariat Administration.
Dachung proceeded to the University of Jos where he obtained a Diploma in Law and subsequently, the Jos ECWA Theological Seminary to broaden his spectrum of Education and knowledge.

Personal life and philanthropy
To improve the educational quality of his constituency, Honorable Dachung Musa Bagos has commissioned two modern classrooms with office, store and solar power for pupils of Gwandang LEA Primary School, Bukuru-Gyel of Jos South LGA of Plateau State. 
He has also paid school fees for female students of Government Technical College Bukuru and distributes hundreds of exercise books to the students of the institution.
His foundation, Dachung Musa Bagos Foundation has given scholarship to 598 students of Government Secondary School Godong in Jos East LGA, and Government Secondary School Chugwi in Jos South LGA.

After an attack by Fulani militants in Plateau State on Sunday 31 July, with seven Christians killed and two others severely injured, Bagos visited the victims, condemned the killings as “callous” and “inhumane”, and paid the medical bills of those injured.

See also 
Peoples Democratic Party

Plateau State

National Assembly

References

Plateau State
Members of the House of Representatives (Nigeria)
1977 births
Living people
Peoples Democratic Party members of the House of Representatives (Nigeria)
People from Plateau State
Nigerian human rights activists
Berom people